Deronectes ferrugineus is a species of beetle in family Dytiscidae. It is endemic to Portugal.

References

Sources

Beetles of Europe
Dytiscidae
Taxonomy articles created by Polbot
Beetles described in 1987